Bəcirəvan (also, Badzhiravan and Badzhirovan) is a village and municipality in the Barda Rayon of Azerbaijan.  It has a population of 1,356.

References 

Populated places in Barda District